In enzymology, a pyrroloquinoline-quinone synthase is an enzyme that catalyzes the chemical reaction

6-(2-amino-2-carboxyethyl)-7,8-dioxo-1,2,3,4,5,6,7,8-octahydroquinoline-2,4-dicarboxylate + 3 O2  4,5-dioxo-3a,4,5,6,7,8,9,9b-octahydro-1H-pyrrolo[2,3-f]quinoline- 2,7,9-tricarboxylate + 2 H2O2 + 2 H2O

The two substrates of this enzyme are 6-(2-amino-2-carboxyethyl)-7,8-dioxo-1,2,3,4,5,6,7,8-octahydroquinoline-2,4-dicarboxylate, and O2, whereas its 3 products are 4,5-dioxo-3a,4,5,6,7,8,9,9b-octahydro-1H-pyrrolo[2,3-f]quinoline-2,7,9-tricarboxylate, H2O2, and H2O.

This enzyme belongs to the family of oxidoreductases, specifically those acting on the CH-CH group of donor with oxygen as acceptor.  The systematic name of this enzyme class is 6-(2-amino-2-carboxyethyl)-7,8-dioxo-1,2,3,4,5,6,7,8-octahydroquinol ine-2,4-dicarboxylate:oxygen oxidoreductase (cyclizing). This enzyme is also called PqqC.

References

 
 
 
 
 

EC 1.3.3
Enzymes of unknown structure